The Girdletree Barnes Bank is located on Snow Hill Road (Route 12) between Snow Hill and Stockton, Girdletree, Maryland, United States.  The bank includes a walk-in vault and antique teller cages.  The Girdletree Barnes Bank now serves as the Girdletree Barnes Bank Museum.

Girdletree Barnes Bank Museum
The Girdletree Barnes Bank Museum displays exhibits and memorabilia from the area.

Footnotes

External links
Girdletree Barnes Bank (Ocean City Vacation and Hotels Guide website)

Museums in Worcester County, Maryland
History museums in Maryland